Serres is a commune in the Aude department in southern France.

Geography
The commune is situated on the Route Departmental D613 between Arques and Couiza. Mount Pech Cardou at an altitude of 795 m overlooks Serres village.

Population

Sights
The village has a 16th-century chateau, church dedicated to St Pierre and Tinel wine museum with a 15th-century vaulted wine cellar.

A 17th-century restored bridge over the river Rialsesse has a Méridienne verte ("Green Meridian") marker. Another marker is situated outside the church at the old olive tree.

Economy
The area produces Chardonnay grapes used in Blanquette wine.

See also
Communes of the Aude department

References

External links

Official website
Accommodation and Activities in Aude Languedoc Roussillon

Communes of Aude